Gürbüzler is a village in the Tunceli District, Tunceli Province, Turkey. The village is populated by Kurds of the Alan tribe and had a population of 66 in 2021.

The hamlet of Yalnızçam is attached to the village.

References 

Villages in Tunceli District
Kurdish settlements in Tunceli Province